Goo Dae-young  (born 9 May 1992) is a South Korean footballer who plays as full-back for FC Anyang in K League 2.

Career
Goo joined K League Challenge side FC Anyang before the 2014 season starts.

Career Statistics

Club

References

External links 

1992 births
Living people
Association football fullbacks
South Korean footballers
FC Anyang players
Asan Mugunghwa FC players
K League 2 players